The 2015–16 Sunfoil Series was a first-class cricket competition held in South Africa from 17 December 2015 to 10 April 2016. Titans won the tournament following a 10-run victory against Cape Cobras in the final round of the competition.

Squads

Points table

Group stage

Fixtures

Round 1

Round 2

Round 3

Round 4

Round 5

Round 6

Round 7

Round 8

Round 9

Round 10

Statistics

Most runs

Most wickets

References

External links
 Series home at ESPN Cricinfo

South African domestic cricket competitions
Sunfoil Series
2015–16 South African cricket season
Sunfoil Series